Sibyl Sophie Julia, Lady Colefax (née Halsey; 1874 – 22 September 1950) was an English interior decorator and socialite in the first half of the twentieth century.

Biography
Colefax was born at Wimbledon, third but only surviving daughter (and fifth and last child) of William Stirling Halsey, of the Indian Civil Service, and Sophie Victoria, daughter of the businessman and politician James Wilson. Her mother's sister, Emily, married the eminent constitutionalist Walter Bagehot. She lived in Cawnpore, India, until the age of 20 when she went on the Grand Tour. In 1901, she married patent lawyer Sir Arthur Colefax, who was briefly the MP for Manchester South West in 1910. They set up home at Argyll House, King's Road, Chelsea and at Old Buckhurst in Sussex. Widely admired for her taste, after she had lost most of her fortune in the Wall Street Crash she began to decorate professionally, using her formidable address book for contacts. She was able to purchase the decorating division of the antique dealers Stair and Andrew of Bruton Street, Mayfair and established Sibyl Colefax Ltd in partnership with Peggy Ward, the Countess Munster. On her 'retirement' (following a family tragedy) Peggy Ward advised her to take on John Fowler (1906–1977) as her partner, which she did in April 1938. The advent of war cut short this partnership. During the Second World War, she organised a soup kitchen and continued to entertain. She often held small lunch parties at The Dorchester known as 'Ordinaries' after which the guest would receive a small bill.

In 1944, the business, managed by John Fowler, took a lease on 39 Brook Street, Mayfair where it remained until December 2016. Also in 1944 Sibyl Colefax sold the business to Nancy Tree (Nancy Lancaster as she became in 1948) for a sum in the order of £10000. She renamed the business Sibyl Colefax and John Fowler Ltd, the name continuing today as the decorating division of the Colefax Group Plc.

Colefax died at her home in Lord North Street, Westminster on 22 September 1950. Harold Nicolson penned an affectionate tribute that appeared shortly after in The Listener. She was the inspiration, according to the art historian John Richardson, for the designer Mrs. Beaver in Evelyn Waugh's A Handful of Dust, and for Mrs. Aldwinkle in Aldous Huxley's Those Barren Leaves. In the 1940s she was referred to frequently by the diarist and socialite politician Henry "Chips" Channon, who describes her as "charming, gentle and sad".

See also

Interior designer

References

Further reading
 A Passion for Friendship by Kirsty McLeod. Michael Joseph, London, 1991.
 Great Hostesses by Brian Masters. Constable, London, 1982.
 'John Fowler, Prince of Decorators' by Martin Wood. Frances Lincoln, London 2007.

1874 births
1950 deaths
English interior designers
English socialites
People from Kanpur